The Lac Caribou is a lake located in the municipality of Saint-Joseph-de-Coleraine, in the MRC des Les Appalaches Regional County Municipality, in the administrative region of Chaudière-Appalaches, in Quebec, Canada.

It is crossed by the Ashberham River which originates on the southern flank of the Collines de Bécancour. The discharge from the lake crosses Petit lac Saint-François, before joining Grand lac Saint François, source of the Saint-François River which joins the St. Lawrence River.

Geography 
The route 112 gives access to the lake.

References 

Lakes of Chaudière-Appalaches
Les Appalaches Regional County Municipality